Plateau is a village on São Tomé Island in the nation of São Tomé and Príncipe. Its population is 99 (2012 census). It lies 1 km northeast of Java and 4 km southwest of Trindade.

Population history

References

Populated places in Mé-Zóchi District